The Four Seasons (Godišnja doba Željke, Višnje i Branke) is a 1979 Yugoslavian Croatian language film directed by Petar Krelja.

External links
 

1979 films
1970s Croatian-language films
Yugoslav drama films
Croatian anthology films
Croatian drama films